The Kvineshei Tunnel is the fourth-longest railway tunnel in Norway at a length of . It is located in Agder county along the Sørlandet Line.

The tunnel was opened in 1943 when the Sørlandet Line was extended to Moi Station.

References

Railway tunnels in Agder
Tunnels on the Sørlandet Line
1943 establishments in Norway
Tunnels completed in 1943
Hægebostad
Kvinesdal